Patricia Evans may refer to:

 Pat Butcher, née Patricia Evans, character in EastEnders
 Pat Evans (mayor), Patricia A. Evans
Patricia Evans, candidate in Kettering local elections
Patricia "Pat" Evans, bald African-American dancer and model featured on the covers of the Ohio Players album covers Pain, Pleasure, and Ecstasy
Patricia Evans, producer on Bobtales
Patricia Evans Mokolo, candidate in United States House of Representatives elections in Alabama, 2010

See also
Pat Evans (disambiguation)